Fred Benjamin Gernerd (November 22, 1879 – August 7, 1948) was an American politician serving as a Republican member of the U.S. House of Representatives from Pennsylvania.

Biography
Fred B. Gernerd was born in Allentown, Pennsylvania.  He graduated from Franklin and Marshall College in Lancaster, Pennsylvania in 1901, from Columbia University's school of political science in New York City in 1903, and from Columbia Law School in 1904. He was admitted to the bar in 1904 and commenced practice in Buffalo, New York.

In 1905, he returned to Allentown, serving as district attorney of Lehigh County from 1908 to 1912. He was a Pennsylvania Republican State Committeeman from 1912 to 1920 and a trustee of Franklin & Marshall College in Lancaster, Pennsylvania and of Cedar Crest College in Allentown.

Gernerd was elected as a Republican to the Sixty-seventh Congress but was an unsuccessful candidate for reelection in 1922. He resumed the practice of law in Allentown and served as a delegate to the Republican National Convention in 1928.

Gernerd died in Allentown and is interred in Trexlertown Cemetery in Trexlertown, Pennsylvania.

Sources

.
Fred Benjamin Gernerd at The Political Graveyard

1879 births
1948 deaths
Cedar Crest College faculty
New York (state) lawyers
Pennsylvania lawyers
Franklin & Marshall College alumni
Columbia Law School alumni
Politicians from Allentown, Pennsylvania
Republican Party members of the United States House of Representatives from Pennsylvania